James Kenneth Lochead (December 23, 1923 - July 25, 1999) was an American figure skater.  He competed in ice dance, winning the gold medal at the 1943 and 1944 United States Figure Skating Championships with partner Marcella May.  He also competed in pairs with May, winning the bronze medal at Nationals in 1944 and 1945, and in men's singles, capturing the silver at the national championships in 1946. Away from the ice, Lochead graduated from the University of California at Berkeley and later earned a master's degree from Harvard University. He later worked for Standard Oil and spent many years living in London.

References

James Lochead's obituary
California Dreamin': The Marcella May Willis And Jimmy Lochead Jr. Story

1923 births
1999 deaths
American male ice dancers
American male pair skaters
American male single skaters
University of California, Berkeley alumni
Harvard University alumni
20th-century American people